Antheraea broschi is a moth of the family Saturniidae found in eastern Malaysia.

External links
Image
Species info

Antheraea
Moths of Malaysia
Moths described in 2001